Mount Dora Christian Academy (formerly Christian Home and Bible School) is a co-educational PreK-12 private Christian school in Mount Dora, Florida, United States. Founded in 1945, Mount Dora Christian Academy is affiliated with, but not directed or funded by, the Churches of Christ. It is accredited by the Southern Association of Colleges and Schools and National Christian School Association.

Mount Dora Christian Academy uses State of Florida adopted curriculum adhering to the Sunshine State Standards. Standardized tests are administered in March each academic year 9th-11th grades. The PSAT/NMSQT is administered in October each year to 10th and 11th grades.

Athletic programs
Thirty-three teams including, Girls and Boys Bowling, Girls and Boys Cross Country, Cheerleading, Girls and Boys Golf, Girls Volleyball, Girls and Boys Weightlifting, Boys and Girls Soccer, Girls and Boys Basketball, Baseball, Softball, Boys and Girls Tennis, and Boys and Girls Track and Field

References

External links
 
 

Christian schools in Florida
Mount Dora, Florida
Private high schools in Florida
Private middle schools in Florida
Private elementary schools in Florida
Schools in Lake County, Florida
Educational institutions established in 1945
1945 establishments in Florida